Reifling is a former municipality in the district of Murtal in Styria, Austria. Since the 2015 Styria municipal structural reform, it is part of the municipality Judenburg.

References

Cities and towns in Murtal District